The Roussilhe oblique stereographic projection is a mapping projection developed by Henri Roussilhe in 1922. The projection uses a truncated series to approximate an oblique stereographic projection for the ellipsoid. The projection received some attention in the former Soviet Union.

The development of the Bulgarian oblique stereographic projection was done for Romania by the Bulgarian geodesist, Hristow, in the late 1930s.

See also
Map projection

References

External links
libproj4 cartographic projection library with Roussilhe oblique stereographic projection support

Map projections
Conformal projections